Emanuel Mendes da Costa (5 June 1717 – 31 May 1791) was an English botanist, naturalist, philosopher, and collector of valuable notes and of manuscripts, and of anecdotes of the literati. Da Costa became infamous for embezzling funds while working at the Royal Society in London and was imprisoned.

Biography

Da Costa came from a Sephardi family that had moved to England in the 1600s from Portugal. His parents were Abraham and Esther (with the Christian names of John and Joanna). Abraham is thought to have been in the diamond business. A brother became a wealthy businessman but Emanuel worked in the office of a notary and qualified from the Scriveners' Company in 1762 but had taken an interest in natural history from around 1736. He began to trade in shells, corals and fossils and corresponded with Carl Linnaeus, Sir Hans Sloane and other naturalists of the period. Da Costa was elected one of the first Jewish Fellows of the Royal Society of London in 1747, sponsored by Martin Folkes, the Duke of Montagu, and others. In 1750 da Costa married a cousin, Leah, whose brother Abraham del Prado was a wealthy contractor for the English army, supplying food. Earlier around 1740 Abraham had employed da Costa in the Netherlands but this led to unpaid debts and resulted in da Costa's imprisonment for two years. In 1763 the death of Francis Hauksbee, who had served for forty years as clerk to the Royal Society, led to an opening that he bid for by enlisting the votes and endorsements from his friends and correspondents. He was appointed clerk, librarian and keeper of the repository and housekeeper of the Royal Society. In 1767 he was discovered to be withholding members' subscription fees, was convicted of fraud, and sentenced to five years in debtors' prison. The issue was detected when John Hope was listed as an annual instead of perpetual member and sought investigation. Da Costa would release the annual membership amount to the Royal Society but draw interest from the remainder of the life membership subscription. After release he struggled to make a living lecturing about fossils, and dealing in shells and minerals. His last scientific publication was British Conchology (1778) which included an autobiographical preface. Some friends remained loyal even after his imprisonment. These included Ingham Forster (1725–82) brother of Jacob Forster (1739-1806). Da Costa died in his home in the Strand and was buried in the Bethahaim Velho, 243 Mile End Road, London.

Da Costa was also a fellow of the Antiquarian Society of London from 1752; a member of the Botanic Society in Florence (Società botanica fiorentina), the  Aurelian Society, and the Gentleman's Society at Spalding. He was married twice, first to Leah who died in 1763 without issue. His second wife Elizabeth Skillman outlived him and they had a daughter.

Works

His publications included:

 A Natural History of Fossils, 1757
 Elements of Conchology, or An Introduction to the Knowledge of Shells, 1776 (illustrated by Peter Brown); 
 British Conchology, 1778
 several papers in the Philosophical Transactions of the Royal Society

Notes

References

Bibliography
 Jewish Encyclopedia
</ref>
James Grout: Da Costa and the Venus dione: The Obscenity of Shell Description, part of the Encyclopædia Romana
 Wikisource DNB entry

External links 
Emanual Mendes da Costa: the First Jewish Clerk of the Royal Society at Google Arts and Culture

Image held at London Metropolitan Archives: https://cityoflondon.gov.uk/lma

1717 births
1791 deaths
18th-century British botanists
Conchologists
English philosophers
Curiel family
Fellows of the Royal Society
English Sephardi Jews
Jewish British scientists
People imprisoned for debt
English librarians
English people of Portuguese-Jewish descent
People convicted of embezzlement